Coleophora sparsipulvella is a moth of the family Coleophoridae. It is found in the United States, including Colorado.

References

sparsipulvella
Moths of North America
Moths described in 1877